Anne Hazen McFarland, M.D. (McFarland; after first marriage, Cromwell; after second marriage, Sharpe; October 10, 1868 – December 13, 1930) was an American physician and medical journal editor.

Early life and education
Anne Hazen McFarland was born October 10, 1868, in Lexington, Kentucky. She was the daughter of Dr. George Clinton and Elizabeth Eliott (Bush) McFarland, also a native of Kentucky. Both the McFarland and Bush families were represented in the Revolutionary War. She was the granddaughter of Andrew McFarland, M. D., LL. D., for many years Superintendent of the Illinois Central Hospital for the Insane. George McFarland, after a service in the Civil War, practiced medicine in Kentucky from 1866 until 1880.

At the age of 12, along with her parents, Anne Hazen McFarland went to live with her grandfather, Andrew McFarland, at Jacksonville, Illinois, who was long celebrated in the treatment of the insane, and founder of Oak Lawn Retreat, also in Jacksonville. In time, her father became Assistant Physician of the Oak Lawn Sanitarium.

McFarland graduated from the Jacksonville Female Academy (now, MacMurray College) after a four years' course in 1887, and later took a course in bookkeeping and stenography at the University of Kentucky. Andrew McFarland saw in his granddaughter the elements from which his theory for the fitness of women for the care of the female insane could be tested, and after a preliminary study under the direction of her father and her grandfather, in 1888, she entered the Woman's Medical College of Northwestern University, Chicago, Illinois, and after three courses of medical lectures, was graduated with honors March 30, 1891.

Career
After graduation from medical school, she was at once installed as Medical Superintendent of the Oak Lawn Sanitarium, thereby fulfilling the earnest desire of her grandfather that she make a special study of the care of the insane. She was a specialist in the department of nervous system disease. She removed a fibroid tumor in a case of acute mania, in June, 1893; and performed four operations upon the heads of epileptics, with two negative results, one improved, and the last cured. McFarland was a critic of contemporary notions that gynecological disorders played a causal role in insanity and nervousness in women. She "ridiculed the gynecological hypothesis as 'dull' and as serving the economic interests of physicians 'who otherwise should have to take to a change of occupation to earn a livelihood.'" In 1914, she was appointed the medical examiner for the women's department of Armour and Company.

McFarland was the author of many papers upon various subjects, among them being "Treatment of the Insane", Transactions Illinois State Medical Society, 1892; "The Lunacy Law of Illinois", ibid., 1893; "Treatment of the insane", n.p., n.d.; "The Relations of Operative Gynecology to Insanity", Medical Review, June, 1893; "Nervous Men, Nervous Women", The Woman's Medical Journal, 1895; and "Nervous Troubles among Women", read before the Physical Culture Club, Springfield, Illinois. For a number of years, she served as associate editor of Woman's Medical Journal, published at Toledo, Ohio, which, at the time, was the only woman's medical journal in the world.

She was a member of the Illinois State Medical Society; Morgan County Medical Society; Brainard District Medical Society; the Capital Medical Society, and the American Medical Society. She was also a member and secretary of the Illinois Queen Isabella Medical Association.

Personal life
One June 10, 1896, McFarland married Vincent Carroll Cromwell, at Jacksonville, Illinois. They made their home at Cromwell place, Lexington. Kentucky, until the death of Mr. Cromwell in 1899. At Jacksonville, Illinois, January 2, 1901, she married J. Thompson Sharpe, the latter born at Port Elizabeth, New Jersey, in November, 1864, whose father and grandfather were both physicians. Since his marriage, Mr. Sharpe became the business manager of the Oak Lawn Sanitarium. Two sons were born to the couple: Vincent Carroll Cromwell, born August 25, 1897; and Maskell McFarland Sharpe, born January 6, 1902.

McFarland was a member of the Rector's Aid Society, the Home Economics Club, and the Country Club, as well as an honorary member of “The Fortnightly”. She was also a Colonial Dame and a Daughter of the American Revolution. In religion, she affiliated with the Trinity Episcopal Church.

Style and themes
McFarland read a paper, "The Lunacy Law of Illinois", at the Annual Meeting of the Illinois State Medical Society in 1893. The Journal of the American Medical Association reported on it, saying:—

Notes

References

Attribution

Bibliography

External links
 

1868 births
1930 deaths
19th-century American writers
19th-century American women writers
19th-century American women physicians
19th-century American physicians
Transylvania University alumni
Northwestern University alumni
Physicians from Lexington, Kentucky
American magazine editors
Women magazine editors
Medical journal editors
University of Kentucky alumni
American neurologists
Women neurologists
Daughters of the American Revolution people
American women non-fiction writers
Year of death missing
National Society of the Colonial Dames of America